During the National Socialist era in Germany, the NS selective schools served to recruit and train young Nazi Party members. There were three types of selective schools:

The National Political Institutes of Education (NPEA, popularly: Napola) were under the patronage of the SA, SS and the Wehrmacht. There were about 35 of these. By 1941, about 6,000 students are said to have attended these institutions.

The Adolf Hitler Schools (AHS) under the supervision of the German Labor Front and the Hitler Youth were Nazi Party schools and not under the Reich Ministry of Education. From 1941, the party-owned schools were referred to as Reich schools.

The Reichsschule Feldafing of the NSDAP was an outstanding exceptional school for the declared training of future leaders for the highest state and social management tasks in the sense of the then prevailing Nazi ideology . This was initially called the National Socialist German High School Starnberger See as a private school of the supreme SA leadership and the National Socialist Teachers League as well as the Nazi Party.

References 
 Harald Scholtz: NS-Ausleseschulen. Internatsschulen als Herrschaftsmittel des Führerstaates. Vandenhoeck & Ruprecht, Göttingen 1973, ISBN 3-525-36156-4.
 Christian Schneider, Cordelia Stillke, Bernd Leineweber: Das Erbe der Napola. Versuch einer Generationengeschichte des Nationalsozialismus. Hamburger Edition, Hamburg 1996, ISBN 3-930908-25-5.
 Hans Günther Zempelin: Des Teufels Kadett. Napola-Schüler von 1936 bis 1943. Gespräch mit einem Freund. 2. unveränderte Auflage. Fischer, Frankfurt am Main 2001, ISBN 3-8301-0042-6.
 Barbara Feller, Wolfgang Feller: Die Adolf-Hitler-Schulen. Pädagogische Provinz versus Ideologische Zuchtanstalt. Juventa, Weinheim u. a. 2001, ISBN 3-7799-1413-1 (Juventa-Materialien).
 Klaus Johann: Grenze und Halt. Der Einzelne im „Haus der Regeln“. Zur deutschsprachigen Internatsliteratur. Universitätsverlag Winter, Heidelberg 2003, ISBN 3-8253-1599-1. (Beiträge zur neueren Literaturgeschichte. Folge 3: 201), S. 510–560 (Kapitel "Internatsliteratur und Nazismus").
 Johannes Leeb (Hrsg.): „Wir waren Hitlers Eliteschüler.“ Ehemalige Zöglinge der NS-Ausleseschulen brechen ihr Schweigen. 7. Auflage. Heyne, München 2005, ISBN 3-453-16504-7.

Education in Nazi Germany
Nazi Party organizations